The 2021 Ally 400 was a NASCAR Cup Series race held on June 20, 2021, at Nashville Superspeedway in Lebanon, Tennessee. Contested over 300 laps on the  superspeedway, it was the 17th race of the 2021 NASCAR Cup Series season.

Report

Background
Nashville Superspeedway is a motor racing complex located in Gladeville, Tennessee (though the track has a Lebanon address), United States, about 30 miles (48 km) southeast of Nashville. The track was built in 2001 and is currently used for events, driving schools and GT Academy, a reality television competition.

It is a concrete oval track 1 miles (2.145 km) long. Nashville Superspeedway is owned by Dover Motorsports, Inc., which also owns Dover International Speedway. Nashville Superspeedway was the longest concrete oval in NASCAR during the time it was on the NASCAR Xfinity Series and NASCAR Camping World Truck Series circuits. Current permanent seating capacity is approximately 25,000. Additional portable seats are brought in for some events, and seating capacity can be expanded to 150,000. Infrastructure is in place to expand the facility to include a short track, drag strip, and road course.

On June 3, NASCAR confirmed the track would reopen to host a Cup race in 2021, replacing one of the two Dover dates.

Entry list
 (R) denotes rookie driver.
 (i) denotes driver who are ineligible for series driver points.

Practice

Practice results

Qualifying

Qualifying results

Race

Aric Almirola won the pole in qualifying. Quin Houff got into the wall on the first lap. Ryan Blaney slammed the wall hard after losing his brakes. Chris Buescher got into the wall along with Justin Haley. Kurt Busch won the first stage while Kyle Larson won the second. Several had brake issues that caused them to get into the wall including Ryan Preece and Chase Briscoe. Larson was able to save enough fuel to hold off Ross Chastain for his third consecutive win and fourth of the season.

Stage Results

Stage One
Laps: 90

Stage Two
Laps: 95

Final Stage Results

Stage Three
Laps: 115

Race statistics
 Lead changes: 14 among 7 different drivers
 Cautions/Laps: 11 for 60
 Red flags: 0
 Time of race: 3 hours, 30 minutes and 23 seconds
 Average speed:

Media

Television
NBC Sports covered the race on the television side. Rick Allen, Jeff Burton, Steve Letarte and Dale Earnhardt Jr. called the race from the broadcast booth. Parker Kligerman, Marty Snider and Kelli Stavast handled the pit road duties from pit lane. Rutledge Wood handled the features from the track.

Radio
Radio coverage of the race was broadcast by Motor Racing Network (MRN) and simulcast on Sirius XM NASCAR Radio.

Standings after the race

Drivers' Championship standings

Manufacturers' Championship standings

Note: Only the first 16 positions are included for the driver standings.
. – Driver has clinched a position in the NASCAR Cup Series playoffs.

Notes

References

Ally 400
NASCAR races at Nashville Superspeedway
Ally 400
Ally 400